Spartocera is a genus of leaf-footed bugs in the family Coreidae. There are about 18 described species in Spartocera.

Species
These 18 species belong to the genus Spartocera:

 Spartocera alternata Dallas, 1852
 Spartocera batatas (Fabricius, 1798) (giant sweetpotato bug)
 Spartocera brevicornis Stål, 1870
 Spartocera bruchii (Pennington, 1921)
 Spartocera cinnamomea (Hahn, 1833)
 Spartocera denticulata Stål, 1870
 Spartocera dentiventris Berg, 1883
 Spartocera diffusa (Say, 1832)
 Spartocera dubia Dallas, 1852
 Spartocera fusca (Thunberg, 1783)
 Spartocera gigantea Distant, 1892
 Spartocera grandis Distant, 1901
 Spartocera granulata Stål, 1870
 Spartocera lativentris Stål, 1870
 Spartocera melas Brailovsky, 1987
 Spartocera pantomima (Distant, 1881)
 Spartocera quadricollis Signoret, 1861
 Spartocera rubicunda Spinola, 1852

References

Further reading

External links

Articles created by Qbugbot
Coreidae genera
Spartocerini